Wayfarers State Park is a  public recreation area  overlooking Flathead Lake, one-half mile south of Bigfork, Montana. The state park hosts the annual Northern Rockies Paddlefest, which in 2013 attracted over 200 participants.

Flora and fauna
The canopy is dominated by pine and fir trees, beneath which bloom seasonal wildflowers. In 1998, the Harry Horn Native Plant Garden was planted, featuring botanical education opportunities and many wildflowers including arrowleaf balsamroot, indian paintbrush, silky lupine, and death camas.

Activities and amenities
The park offers 30 campsites and a boat ramp. Visitors may access the boat ramp for aquatic activities, and fisherman may fish the waters of Flathead Lake. In 2016, development plans were announced by Montana State Parks for the improvement of a bicycle campground area to feature spots for 10 campsites and bicycle-related amenities.

References

External links
Wayfarers State Park Montana Fish, Wildlife & Parks
Wayfarers State Park Trail Map Montana Fish, Wildlife & Parks

Protected areas of Flathead County, Montana
State parks of Montana
Protected areas established in 1969
1969 establishments in Montana